Vaibhavi Merchant is an Indian dance choreographer working in Bollywood films. She won the National Film Award for Best Choreography for the song Dholi Taaro Dhol Baaje from Hum Dil De Chuke Sanam in 1999.

Career 
Merchant born in Chennai, Tamil Nadu, to Ramesh Merchant and Hridaya Merchant. She is the granddaughter of choreographer B. Hiralal & the elder sister of Shruti Merchant.

She began her career by assisting her uncle Chinni Prakash. In 1999, she did her first solo work for the choreography of the song Dhol Baaje for the film Hum Dil De Chuke Sanam. She won the National Film Award for Best Choreography for her work.

She had her acting debut in a Malayalam film Snehapoorvam Anna in 2000.

She took a short break from the industry and then returned with the song O Ri Chhori in the 2001 film Lagaan. She then choreographed Kajra Re from Bunty Aur Babli (2005) that fetched her several awards. She continued to choreograph selected numbers in films such as Devdas, Baghban, Fida, Dhoom (as well as its two sequels), Veer-Zaara, Aaja Nachle, Rab Ne Bana Di Jodi and Aiyyaa. She also choreographed the Australian musical The Merchants of Bollywood, a musical written by Toby Gough about her family.

She has been a judge on various television dance reality shows like Nach Baliye 3, Jhalak Dikhhla Jaa (season 3), Zara Nachke Dikha 2, and Just Dance.

Filmography

As choreographer

{{columns-list|
1999: Hum Dil De Chuke Sanam (Dhol Baaje)
2001: Albela
2001: Lagaan
2002: Filhaal
2002: Na Tum Jaano Na Hum
2002: Devdas
2002: Deewangee
2002: Karz: The Burden of Truth
2002: Guru Mahaguru
2003: Dil Ka Rishta
2003: Dum
2003: Kash Aap Hamare Hote
2003: Haasil
2003: Mumbai Se Aaya Mera Dost
2004: Aetbaar
2004: Rudraksh
2004: Meenaxi: A Tale of Three Cities
2004: Shaadi Ka Laddoo
2004: Garv
2004: Kyun! Ho Gaya Na...
2004: Fida
2004: Dhoom
2004: Rakht
2004: Dil Ne Jise Apna Kahaa
2004: Madhoshi
2004: Tumsa Nahin Dekha
2004: Veer Zaara
2004: Swades
2004: Dil Maange More
2005: Chehraa
2005: Bunty Aur Babli
2005: No Entry
2005: Ramji Londonwaley
2005: Athadu (Telugu)
2005: Shaadi No. 1
2005: Neal 'n' Nikki
2005: Shikhar
2006: Rang De Basanti
2006: Humko Tumse Pyaar Hai
2006: Fanaa
2006: Krrish
2006: Umrao Jaan
2006: Baabul
2006: Chamki Chameli
2006: Dhoom 2
2007: Marigold
2007: Heyy Babyy
2007: Aaja Nachle
2007: Jhoom Barabar Jhoom
2007: Ta Ra Rum Pum
2008: Love Story 2050
2008: Rab Ne Bana Di Jodi
2008: Thoda Pyaar Thoda Magic
2008: Bhoothnath
2008: Dostana
2008: Tashan
2009: Dil Bole Hadippa
2009: Luck By Chance
2009: Delhi-6
2009: Kurbaan
2009: Kambakkht Ishq
2010: No Problem
2010: Band Baaja Baaraat
2011: Don 2
2011: Game
2011: Zindagi Na Milegi Dobara
2011: Ladies vs Ricky Bahl
2011: Bodyguard
2012: Aiyyaa
2012: Ek Tha Tiger
2012: Jab Tak Hai Jaan
2013: Bombay Talkies
2013: Bhaag Milkha Bhaag
2013: Dhoom 3
2016: Fan
2016: Sultan
2016: Befikre
2017: Jab Harry Met Sejal
2017: OK Jaanu
2017: Tiger Zinda Hai
2018: Hichki
2018: Loveratri
2018: Naa Peru Surya, Naa Illu India (Telugu)
2018: Bharat
2019: Saaho
2019: Dabangg 3
2022: Radhe Shyam
2022: Pathaan

As actor

 2000: Snehapoorvam Anna a Malayalam movie directed by Sangeet Sivan.
 2012: Student of the Year special appearance in the song Disco Deewane.

Awards 

2000: National Film Award for Best Choreography - Dholi Taaro Dhol Baaje from (Hum Dil De Chuke Sanam)
2006: IIFA Award for Best Choreography - Kajra Re from (Bunty Aur Babli) 
2006: Zee Cine Award for Best Choreography - Kajra Re from (Bunty Aur Babli) 
2006: Bollywood Movie Award for Best Choreography - Kajra Re from (Bunty Aur Babli) 
2006: Producers Guild Film Award for Best Choreography - Kajra Re from (Bunty Aur Babli) 
2008: IIFA Award for Best Choreography - Aaja Nachle from (Aaja Nachle)

References

External links
 
 

Indian film choreographers
Living people
Actresses in Malayalam cinema
Indian film actresses
Indian female dancers
Indian women choreographers
Indian choreographers
21st-century Indian actresses
Actresses from Mumbai
Women artists from Maharashtra
Dancers from Maharashtra
21st-century Indian dancers
21st-century Indian women artists
Year of birth missing (living people)
Best Choreography National Film Award winners